Mohamed Waheed Hassan Manik (Arabic: مُحَمَّد وَحِيد حَسَن مَانِيك; born 3 January 1953) is a Maldivian politician who served as the fifth President of Maldives from 7 February 2012 to 17 November 2013, having succeeded to office following the resignation of President Mohamed Nasheed, under whom Waheed had served as Vice President. He had previously worked as a news anchor, a United Nations official with UNICEF, UNDP and UNESCO, and a member of the Maldivian Parliament.  

On 7 February 2012, he assumed the office of president following the resignation of the incumbent, Mohamed Nasheed. Initially, Nasheed claimed that a coup d'état had occurred, however these claims were proved to be false by an independent report from the Commission of National Inquiry. Nasheed initially accepted this report "with reservations", but later refuted it in its entirety.  

His short tenure in office is regarded as one of the most turbulent periods in Maldivian history.  President Waheed was subjected to racial abuse during his presidency and was branded a traitor by the supporters of his former ally Mohamed Nasheed. President Waheed was defeated in the 2013 election, having received only a little over 5% of the vote. The results of that election were later annulled, however, Waheed chose not to stand for re-election.

Having taken the office at the age of 59, he is the oldest person to have been elected as president.

Early life and education
Waheed was born to Hassan Ibrahim Maniku and Aishath Moosa. He was the first of ten children. President Waheed attended the American University of Beirut for four years, studying for two of those years in the midst of the Lebanese civil war; completing a bachelor's degree in English Language as well as a diploma in teaching. By 1976, President Waheed returned home to the Maldives, and took up a post teaching the Language at Jamaaludheen School in Male' (the capital of the Maldives). President Waheed taught many students who would become highly influential members of Maldivian society both in the Government, as well as in the private sector. Among his students is the popular television comedian Yoosuf Rafeeu (commonly known as Yoosay), along with members of the government such as the former Executive Secretary to the Parliament Abdulla Shahid. President Waheed also taught many senior civil servants such as the current Elections Commissioner and the Minister for Presidential Affairs Mohammed Hussein. During this time, President Waheed also helped develop the first English language curriculum in Maldivian schools.

By September 1976, President Waheed was granted a full scholarship to attend Stanford University in the United States. After completing his master's degree in education Planning in 1979, he returned home to the Maldives in order to begin working for the Ministry of Education. After his graduation, he remained in the United States for two more years due to the necessity of his newly born son to receive medical treatment. And although he had the opportunity to remain in the United States, he elected to return home, giving up his job as a project manager of a technology firm, in San Francisco. He went to Addu after that due to political issues.

On his return to Maldives from Addu (at the end of 1988), he became director of educational services in the Ministry of Education. He was placed in charge of the Ministry for several months unit the Education Minister was appointed. During this time he also served as a member of the National council for Dhivehi Language and Literature, a member of the Atolls Development Advisory board, and a member for the Maldives Youth council.

Early political career
In 2003, long-standing President Maumoon Abdul Gayoom appointed Waheed to the Constitutional Assembly convened to amend the constitution of the country. When Waheed realized that the Members of Parliament would not be able to make dramatic reforms, he left the Maldives to complete his education in the United States where he received two Masters and a PhD from Stanford University; he was the first Maldivian to earn the latter degree.

After completing his education, he returned and stood for Parliament. In 1989, Waheed ran against Gayoom's brother-in-law, Ilyas Ibrahim. Despite this opposition, Waheed won the seat.

Owing to Waheed’s vacillating political stance, a video song titled ‘Waheed Come and Waheed Go’ was reportedly made by Mohamed Shareef (Mundu) to the tune of Cotton Eye Joe, which later became viral.

Controversies

It is believed and confirmed by other children of his mother Aishath Moosa that she was subjected to torture during Maumoon Abdul Gayoom’s tenure and later passed away from her injuries while her son Naushad Waheed was in prison. He was not allowed to attend her funeral.   

Waheed claims to be the first citizen of the Maldives to receive a PhD, having received it at Stanford University in the U.S., and the first person to appear on Maldivian Television. However, there are several who disputed this claim.   

Waheed was the first Maldivian Vice President to have fully succeeded to presidency, when President Mohamed Nasheed resigned after a mutiny, until November 2013.

Soon after taking office during his first press conference, he infamously asked, ‘Do I look like a man who would stage a coup d’état?’.  Although, he vehemently denies being part of a coup, during a press conference he revealed, ’I have proud political parties in this country who are backing me. And then I have all the law enforcement agencies’ fully backing me.’

United Nations career
Waheed left Maldives in 1992, and he took a job with UNICEF, working in Tanzania and then Bangladesh. He would later be transferred to the UN Headquarters in New York and made a senior advisor coordinating global policy for UNICEF. In 2001, he was transferred to UNICEF South Asia based in Kathmandu, Nepal, where he headed programs for the region. He was later made the head of UNICEF Afghanistan.

Soon, Waheed was asked to return to New York, where he was the UNICEF representative and the Associate Director to the UNDCO. Due to political developments in the Maldives, Waheed retired from the UN, and returned home to try to play a role in bringing democracy to the country. However, as his resources depleted, and as he felt the main opposition party began to favor a more militant approach, Waheed returned to the UN, performing short-term assignments. During his time in UNICEF, Waheed was the head of UNICEF South Asia, Afghanistan, Yemen, Macedonia, Montenegro, and Turkmenistan.

2008 presidential election
After his career in the United Nations, Waheed returned to the Maldives once again to stand for the leadership of the newly formed Maldivian Democratic Party (MDP). Waheed lost the leadership election by a narrow margin.  Waheed had given up his position in UNICEF. In 2006, after his work with MDP, he took up a consultancy position. In June 2008, Waheed returned to the Maldives and formed his own political party. Later on, most of his party members, including all the senior figures, reverted to MDP: Gaumee Itthihaad.

Waheed was chosen as the presidential candidate of Gaumee Itthihaad Party (GIP) in the beginning of September. However, when the election date was announced in early October, GIP formed a coalition with the Maldivian Democratic Party, after being approached by the two other main opposition groups: the New Maldives Movement and the Jumhooree Party. Though Waheed was asked to become the vice presidential candidate for both the other parties, Gaumee Itthihaad chose to form an alliance with the largest opposition party, Maldivian Democratic Party, only days before the deadline for the submission of the candidates names. Mohamed Nasheed who was elected as the presidential candidate of MDP chose Waheed as his vice in the October 2008 presidential election. This was the first democratic election in the history of the country and ended Gayoom's 30-year reign.

After they won the election, Nasheed and his vice, Waheed, were sworn in on 11 November 2008, in a special session of the People's Majlis at Dharubaaruge. Waheed was inaugurated as the nation's first elected vice president, the first to serve in the post when it was reinstated after over 50 years.

Coup allegations and presidency
On 7 February 2012, Waheed assumed the presidency following the disputed resignation of President Nasheed, who asserted that he was forced to resign at gunpoint in a coup d'état. A week later, protesters led by Waheed's own brother, Naushad Waheed, accused Mohammed Waheed of complicity in the alleged coup. Waheed was also criticised both by Nasheeds party and several Human Rights organizations and by the international community for several human rights violations during his term. Waheed and his supporters, however, state that the transfer of power was voluntary and constitutional, and have agreed to launch an independent review of the events surrounding Nasheed's resignation.

BBC News reported that Waheed's subsequent appointment of several ministers associated with the former president Gayoom "raised eyebrows", and that "most believe other forces were at play" behind the protests that chased Nasheed from office. On 11 February, Waheed offered a unity cabinet, but this offer was rejected by Nasheed's supporters. On 19 February, Waheed appointed Gayoom's daughter Dhunya Maumoon to his cabinet, prompting a new round of criticism, but also appointed Shaheem Ali Saeed, who is "considered progressive".

In the weeks following the alleged coup, Nasheed requested that the Commonwealth of Nations threaten the Maldives with expulsion unless new elections are held. The Commonwealth has supported Nasheed's call for early elections, calling on both Nasheed and Waheed to enter talks to arrange new polls before the year's end. Waheed said that early elections could be possible, but that "the conditions have to be right to ensure there will be free and fair elections".

On 1 March 2012, Waheed was blocked from opening the Maldivian Parliament by Nasheed, who accused him of breaking a promise to set a date for a new election. On 19 March, he attempted to open parliament again and was once more blocked by Nasheed pro parliamentarians. Four opposition MPs were removed from the building when they tried to physically assault Waheed during his speech. Waheed responded with a speech calling for national unity.

2013 Presidential candidacy
On 7 September 2013, Waheed stood as a candidate for the presidency of the Maldives. In his first independent bid for elected office, Waheed was routed in the four-way race which pitted him against three other candidates, amongst them, frontrunner and former president Mohamed Nasheed. Nasheed finished in first place with 45.45% of all valid ballots cast (95,224 votes). Nasheed was trailed by Abdullah Yameen who received 25.40% of the vote share (53,099), Gasim Ibrahim of the Jumhooree Party who received 24.02% of all votes (50,422), and Waheed with only 5.13% of the votes (10,750).. This is probably the fewest votes received by any sitting president in recorded history.

The fairness of the results of the 2013 elections has been challenged in the Supreme Court. Various reports suggest duplicates, names of deceased and underaged in the official voter list. Political leaders are insisting on a thorough investigation so as to prevent any vote rigging in the run off. On 24 September 2013 the Supreme Court injunction signed by the majority of four judges of the seven-judge bench asked the commission and relevant state institutions to delay the runoff until the court rules on the case filed by Jumhoory Party (JP) seeking annulment of the first round results alleging vote rigging.

Waheed announced his withdrawal from the rerun of the 2013 presidential election later scheduled for 9 November 2013, after polling held on 7 September 2013 was annulled by the Supreme Court.

Family
He is married to Ilham Hussain, founder of Maldives Autism Association. They have three children: Widhadh, Fidha and Jeffrey Salim Waheed.

Jeffery Salim Waheed was posted as Additional Secretary during his father’s presidency and Deputy Minister during Abdulla Yameen’s tenure.

References

|-

1953 births
Living people
Presidents of the Maldives
Vice presidents of the Maldives
Stanford Graduate School of Education alumni
People from Malé
Maldivian Muslims
Gaumee Itthihaad politicians
Maldivian Democratic Party politicians